Habington is a surname. Notable people with the surname include:

Edward Habington (1553?–1586), one of the conspirators in the Babington plot
Thomas Habington (1560–1647), English antiquarian
William Habington (1605–1654), English poet

English-language surnames